Črnivec is a settlement in the Municipality of Radovljica in the Upper Carniola region of Slovenia.

Geography

There is an abandoned Peračica tuff quarry in the foothills immediately north of Črnivec. Peračica Falls ( or Peračiški slap) is located along Peračica Creek on the northern edge of the village's territory. It is a  waterfall flowing over andesitic tuff.

References

External links

Črnivec at Geopedia

Populated places in the Municipality of Radovljica